The Tunbridge World's Fair is an annual event held in mid-September in Tunbridge, Vermont.  The annual fair continues to this day with demonstrations of farming and agricultural traditions and culture, working antique displays, horse and ox pulling, horse racing, cattle and horse shows, junior exhibits, floral and 4-H exhibits, contra dancing, gymkhana, and many free shows.

History
The Tunbridge World's Fair began in 1867 and has been held annually for  years. The first eight fairs were held in North Tunbridge, Vermont, while the following have been held in Tunbridge. The fair is currently chaired by Alan Howe, who took over from Euclid Farnham after the 2009 fair. Farnham had been president of the fair for over 30 years, and had made major efforts to change the fair from a "drunkards reunion," with "girlie-shows" (strip shows) and unlimited alcohol, to a more family-friendly environment.

There were cancellations in 1917–18, 1942–44 & 2020.

Operation
The fair is operated by a board of 100 shareholders. The shares were first sold in 1901 to raise funds for the fair's continued operation. Shares are passed through families and give the shareholders 100th ownership and a vote in fair proceedings. The fair, however, is a completely non-profit venture and shareholders receive no portion of the fair's revenue.

References

External links 
 
 Friends of the Tunbridge Fair

Agricultural shows in the United States
Festivals in Vermont
Tunbridge, Vermont
Tourist attractions in Orange County, Vermont
Festivals established in 1867